The Viceroy was a scooter introduced by the British motorcycle manufacturer Veloce Ltd in 1960.
Only 700 were sold before the model was discontinued in 1964. 
The Viceroy was considered an unusual design, as the transverse two-stroke horizontally opposed twin cylinder 250cc engine was placed at the front of the scooter.

References 

Motor scooters
Viceroy
Vehicles introduced in 1960